Karim-David Adeyemi (born 18 January 2002) is a German professional footballer who plays as a forward for Bundesliga club Borussia Dortmund and the Germany national team.

Club career

Red Bull Salzburg
Adeyemi played as a youth for TSV Forstenried, and at the age of eight he joined local Bundesliga side FC Bayern München in 2010. Due to an impasse in negotiating his continued stay at the club, there was a dispute and Adeyemi eventually had to leave the club, which meant that he joined SpVgg Unterhaching in 2012. After progressing through the youth departments, he made his debut in March 2018 for the U19 team in the A-Junioren-Bundesliga (Under 19 Bundesliga). He scored his first goal in this league in April 2018 in a 2–3 loss to Eintracht Frankfurt U19. With Unterhaching, he suffered relegation to the A-Jugend Bayernliga (Under 19 Bayernliga) at the end of the season.

Prior to the 2018–19 season, Adeyemi was signed by Austrian club FC Red Bull Salzburg where he signed a three-year contract. He was subsequently loaned out to their feeder club FC Liefering for the season. Adeyemi made his 2. Liga debut on 1 September 2018 against Austria Lustenau, where he played the full game as Liefering lost 1–0. On 1 December 2020, he scored his first Champions League goal in a 3–1 away win over Lokomotiv Moscow during the 2020–21 season.

Borussia Dortmund
On 10 May 2022, Adeyemi was announced to have joined Bundesliga club Borussia Dortmund on a deal until the summer of 2027. On 5 October, he scored his first Champions League goal with Borussia Dortmund in a 4–1 away win over Sevilla. On 15 February 2023, he scored the only goal from a solo strike in a 1–0 victory over Chelsea in the Champions League round of 16 and revealed that Fufu - an African dish makes him fast.

International career
Adeyemi was born in Munich, Germany, to a Nigerian father and Romanian mother. He is a youth international for Germany, having represented the Germany under-16s, under-17s and under-21s. He made his debut for the Germany senior team in a 6–0 2022 FIFA World Cup qualification win over Armenia on 5 September 2021, coming on as a late substitute and scoring his side's sixth goal in the first minute of second-half injury time. As Adeyemi was a Red Bull Salzburg player on his debut, this marked the first time in the post-war period that a player from an Austrian club played a match for the German senior national team.

In November 2022, he was named in the German squad for the 2022 FIFA World Cup in Qatar. However, he did not feature in any match, as Germany were knocked out from the group stage.

Career statistics

Club

International

As of match played 11 October 2021. Germany score listed first, score column indicates score after each Adeyemi goal.

Honours
Red Bull Salzburg
Austrian Bundesliga: 2019–20, 2020–21, 2021–22
Austrian Cup: 2019–20, 2020–21, 2021–22

Germany U21
UEFA European Under-21 Championship: 2021

Individual
Fritz Walter Medal U19 Gold: 2021
Fritz Walter Medal U17 Gold: 2019
Austrian Bundesliga Top goalscorer: 2021–22
Austrian Bundesliga Team of the Year: 2021–22
Bundesliga Rookie of the Month: January 2023

References

External links

Profile at the Borussia Dortmund website

 Database4football Profile

2002 births
Living people
Footballers from Munich
German footballers
Germany international footballers
Germany youth international footballers
Germany under-21 international footballers
German sportspeople of Nigerian descent
German people of Romanian descent
Yoruba sportspeople
Association football forwards
SpVgg Unterhaching players
FC Red Bull Salzburg players
FC Liefering players
Borussia Dortmund players
German expatriate footballers
German expatriate sportspeople in Austria
Expatriate footballers in Austria
Austrian Football Bundesliga players
2. Liga (Austria) players
Bundesliga players
2022 FIFA World Cup players